The title of People's Hero of Kazakhstan is the highest distinction conferred by the Republic of Kazakhstan, along with the Order of the Golden Eagle.

Overview
According to the Law on State Awards of the Republic of Kazakhstan, the honor would be bestowed on Kazakhs and foreigners who have performed extraordinary service to the Republic, or for exemplary military or civil exploits done in the name of its independence or freedom. Individuals who are granted the title also receive the Order of the Fatherland (Otan). People's Hero is the country's highest award, equaled only by the Order of the Golden Eagle. Those conferred with the title are awarded a gilded medal in the form of a seven-rayed star, with colorless Zirconium stones set between its rays. Recipients are exempt from property tax and other obligations. 

The award was established by a decree of President Nursultan Nazarbayev on 21 December 1993. On 23 May 1994, Defense Minister Sagadat Nurmagambetov received the title, becoming the first People's Hero of Kazakhstan.

Notable recipients  
Sagadat Nurmagambetov (1994)
Toktar Aubakirov (1995)
Talgat Musabayev (1995)
Yuri Malenchenko (1995)
Shafik Chokin (1996)
Roza Baglanova (1996)
Qairat Rysqulbekov (1996, posthumously)
Bakhtyuras Besikbayev (1998, posthumously)
Rakhimzhan Qoshqarbaev (1999, posthumously)
Khiuaz Dospanova (2004)
Mukhtar Altynbayev (2006)
Baurzhan Momyshuly (posthumously)
Nursultan Nazarbayev (2019)

See also
Orders, decorations, and medals of Kazakhstan

References

External links
People's Hero of Kazakhstan. medals.uk.

Orders, decorations, and medals of Kazakhstan

Awards established in 1993
Hero (title)